Anne Samplonius (born 11 February 1968) is a road cyclist from Canada. She was born in the United States, has lived most of her life in Canada, and is a citizen of both countries. Samplonius graduated from the University of Alberta with a bachelor's degree in Recreational Administration in 1992. She was a silver medallist in the time trial at the 1994 UCI Road World Championships, and was a double winner of the Canadian National Time Trial Championships. Samplonius also won the gold medal in the time trial at the 2007 Pan American Games. She represented her nation at the 2000, 2001, 2006, 2007, 2008 and 2010 UCI Road World Championships. She competed in 12 World Championships during her career, and retired from racing at the end of 2012. Following her retirement Samplonius joined Trek Factory Racing as their content manager in November 2013, after working as online digital editor for the RusVelo team in 2012. She also works as a cycling coach.

From at least 1992 to 2007, she lived in Brampton.

References

External links
 profile at Procyclingstats.com

1968 births
Canadian female cyclists
Living people
Place of birth missing (living people)
American emigrants to Canada
American female cyclists
Naturalized citizens of Canada
Commonwealth Games medallists in cycling
Commonwealth Games silver medallists for Canada
Pan American Games medalists in cycling
Pan American Games gold medalists for Canada
Cyclists at the 2007 Pan American Games
Cyclists at the 1994 Commonwealth Games
Medalists at the 2007 Pan American Games
Medallists at the 1994 Commonwealth Games